The Republic of Sierra Leone Armed Forces are the armed forces of Sierra Leone, responsible for the territorial security of Sierra Leone's borders and defending the national interests of Sierra Leone, within the framework of the 1991 Sierra Leone Constitution and International laws. The armed forces were formed after independence in 1961, on the basis of elements of the former British Royal West African Frontier Force, then present in the Sierra Leone Colony and Protectorate. Circa 2010, the Sierra Leone Armed Forces consisted of around 13,000 personnel.

Before Sierra Leone gained independence in 1961, the military was known as the Royal Sierra Leone Military Force. The armed forces seized control in 1968, bringing the National Reformation Council into power. On 19 April 1971, when Sierra Leone became a republic, the Royal Sierra Leone Military Force was renamed as the Republic of Sierra Leone Military Force (RSLMF). The RSLMF remained a single service organisation until 1979 when the Sierra Leone Navy was established. It then remained largely unchanged for 16 years until in 1995 when Defence Headquarters was established and the Sierra Leone Air Wing formed. The RSLMF was then renamed the Armed Forces of the Republic of Sierra Leone.

The Sierra Leone Armed Forces is headed by the Chief of Defence Staff, who is legally the most senior military officer in the Sierra Leone Army. The President of Sierra Leone has the constitutional authority to dismiss the Chief of Defence Staff of the Sierra Leone Armed Forces at any time. The current Chief of Defence Staff of the Sierra Leone Armed Forces is Major General Brima Sesay. He was appointed by President Ernest Bai Koroma. Major Sesay succeeded Major General John Milton was removed as Chief of Defence Staff of the Sierra Leone Armed Forces on 30 November 2017.

President Ahmad Tejan Kabbah announced in January 2002 that the Sierra Leone Army would be unified with the tiny Sierra Leone Air Force and the moribund Sierra Leone Navy to form a reconstituted force known as the Republic of Sierra Leone Armed Forces.

During the state of emergency announced in the country due to the 2014 West Africa Ebola outbreak, the Armed Forces aided in protecting quarantine zones for those infected with the virus.

Leadership

The President of Sierra Leone is constitutionally the commander in chief of the military.  The Sierra Leone Ministry of Defence and National Security is in charge of supervising the military. The department is headed by a minister of defence and national security, who is a civilian and a member of the president's Cabinet. The current defence minister is a retired major general, Alfred Paolo Conteh.

The Chief of the Defence Staff (CDS) is the professional head of the RSLAF. He is responsible for the administration and the operational control of the Sierra Leonean military. It is the highest rank military position in the country. The current chief of the defence staff is Robert Yira Koroma, who was appointed by former President Ernest Bai Koroma in August 2010 to replace Major General Alfred Nelson Williams, who was placed on terminal leave.

Brigadier David Lansana was appointed army commander of Sierra Leone in 1964. Brigadier Lansana took control of the army from British colonial adviser, Brigadier R.D. Blackie when Lansana's close ally Prime Minister Albert Margai came to power. He came from the Mende tribe as did Margai and conflicts existed between northern tribes, the Krios and the Mendes. In 1967 Margai, who promoted a one party (non-democratic) state was beaten in a general election. Lansana staged a brief coup, arresting Siaka Stevens, the democratic winner of the election and the army was purged of Northern and Krio officers.

In 1985, Major General Joseph Saidu Momoh, the army commander, succeeded President Siaka Stevens as president. It is not clear what exactly Momoh's title was but it seems likely that he was the senior Sierra Leonean military officer and held the predecessor to the CDS's post.

Komba Mondeh served as CDS during the NPRC administration of 1992–1996.

Brigadier-General Tom Carew was Chief of Defence Staff from April 2000 to November 2003. He may have been promoted to major general during his tenure.

Major General Alfred Nelson-Williams is currently the Chief of the Defence Staff. Nelson-Williams succeeded the retiring Major General Edward Sam M'boma on 12 September 2008.

Sierra Leone Army

The Army is modelled on the British Army and came into existence after independence in 1961. The core of the army was based on the Sierra Leone Battalion of the Royal West African Frontier Force, which became the Royal Sierra Leone Regiment and later the Republic of Sierra Leone Regiment.

In 1991 the RUF began to make war against the government, and the army went on the offensive toward the end of the year along with troops from Guinea. In 1992 the army was expanded to 6,150 under President Joseph Saidu Momoh in a 'poorly designed strategy that eradicated the few remaining elements of cohesion in the military... recruits were mainly drifters, rural and urban unemployed, a fair number of hooligans, drug addicts, and thieves.'

A similar expansion effort after Valentine Strasser took over aimed to build the army to 14,000, using young criminals, school drop-outs, and semi-literate youths. 'In consequence, the army became further fragmented, leading to the complete breakdown of command and control during the war, and again after the AFRC coup of 1997.'

During the long Sierra Leone civil war which the government fought against the Revolutionary United Front from 1991 to 2002, the 1992 Sierra Leonean coup d'état brought the armed forces into power again. In 1997 the Armed Forces Revolutionary Council seized power. Over 15,000 perished during the war. After peace returned, the armed forces were slowly reduced in size, from around 13,500 personnel in 2007 to 8,500 in 2010. The British Armed Forces, in the shape of the roughly 100-strong International Military Assistance Training Team (IMATT), is assisting in the formation of the new armed forces. IMATT is slated to downsize to 45–55 personnel by the end of 2010.

Today the army is by far the largest Armed Forces branch and is responsible for protection of the state borders, the security of administered territories and defending the national interests of Sierra Leone within the framework of its international obligations. It had an active force of about 13,300 personnel circa 2007. There were plans to reduced strength to 8,500 by 2011. However, the reduction in strength to 8,500 was achieved by the end of 2009.

The force appears to consist of three brigades, 3 Brigade, in the past headquartered at Kenema, but as of 2011 seemingly at Murray Town Barracks, Freetown, which covers the Eastern Province. 3 Brigade probably includes 9th Battalion RSLAF at Simbakoro outside Koidu).

From 1985 to 1991 1st Battalion was at Wilberforce Barracks, Freetown. Elsewhere are 4 Brigade, at Teko Barracks, Makeni, which covers the Northern Province (including 2nd Battalion RSLAF at Teko Barracks, Makeni, as of 2003), and 5 Brigade, which covers the Southern Province from headquarters at Gondama Barracks, Bo. As of 2002, about six IMATT advisors were deployed with each RSLAF brigade to assist with training, planning, personnel, and operations.

As stability and peace deepened in Sierra Leone, the RSLAF aimed to create a capability to contribute to international peace support operations. Official websites said that '..To this end the RSLAF has targeted 2007 as the base year to initiate a Company for Peace Support Operations for the Economic Community of West African States (ECOWAS), the African Union and the UN. This would be gradually increased to a battalion strength by 2010. As a demonstration of this desire, a Peace Support Operations Course was introduced into the curriculum of the Horton Military Academy in Freetown. The course was intended to enhance capacity building, and to train and prepare officers of the RSLAF for their future role and participation in international peace support operations, and especially for the proposed ECOWAS Standby Force.'

The hoped-for initial operational capability date for peacekeeping slipped until late 2009, when a Sierra Leonean reconnaissance company was deployed to Darfur as part of UNAMID.() International donors and the Government of Sierra Leone provided the $6.5 million required to equip the unit and build the base camp in-theatre, some 2,300 kilometers inland from Port Sudan. The contingent is under the command of Lieutenant Colonel S.E.T. Marah.

Despite the enormous resources invested by the UK into security sector reform in Sierra Leone, there are continuing financial pressures. Pay for soldiers is only GBP 45 plus some rice for a private per month, rising to GBP 350 for the Chief of Defence Staff. There are continued serious financial pressures on monthly running costs, with fuel, rations, stationery, and maintenance 'for both equipment and the estate' rarely funded. Housing is generally of low quality. 'Operation Pebu' planned to build new barracks for the force, was badly planned and thus extremely over-ambitious. As a result, it was cut down to only two sites (Albrecht and Jackson 2009). In 2010 Robertshawe said that 'living accommodation for soldiers and their families is generally appalling with no running water or ablutions and often is a self-built shack or mud hut.'

Official sources said in 2012: 
Without holidaying, commanders at all levels are steadfast to project on the force outfits and outputs. This line of thought strictly conforms to the dynamics of the strategically, operational and tactical construction of our thinking. Thus, the establishment of Artillery, tailoring and the Armed forces Agricultural Units sit between these initiatives. The translation of these efforts is the Establishment review of 2010. Painstakingly as a force we are striving to catch up with information technology. The Africa Endeavour programme pioneered by the United States of Africa Command (AFRICOM) has however served an eye opener to our communications need both within and out. Our data over HF communication platform continue to play a central role in facilitating communication force wide.

Equipment

Sierra Leone has very limited modern weaponry. The country has a wide variety of used second-hand foreign imported arms. The IISS Military Balance 2020 lists 31 mortars, Carl Gustav recoilless rifles, and three air defence guns in service. Other army equipment may include the Heckler & Koch G3, FN FAL, AK-47, RPD light machine gun, and the RPG-7.

Two T-72 tanks were ordered from Ukraine in 1994 and were delivered to Sierra Leone via Poland in 1995. Although briefly serviced and maintained by South African firm Executive Outcomes, their operational status is somewhat doubtful. Freetown's mechanized forces are backed by at least ten ex-Slovak OT-64 and three Casspir wheeled armoured personnel carriers.

Naval component

The RSLN was an arm of the Republic of Sierra Leone Armed Forces that is responsible sea patrol of Sierra Leone's territorial waters. In 2002 it was merged with the other service branches. Today the naval force has about 500 personnel and operates several small patrol craft and barges. Their primary responsibility is to protect and safeguard the territorial integrity of Sierra Leone's sea. Sierra Leone naval officers are trained by British forces. They received financial support from Britain and China.

On 25 September 2007, eight Guinean Naval officers were arrested by the Sierra Leone Navy for an act of piracy against locally licensed fishermen inside Sierra Leonean waters. One of the attacking speedboats escaped north towards Guinea, while the other was seized. The eight men arrested were found with AK-47 automatic rifles and bags of fish, including high-value snapper, taken off the Sierra Leone-licensed vessels.

Equipment

7 Type-62 FAC, delivered between 1973 and 2006
3 Pompoli class LSU (delivered from Japan in 1980)

Air arm

In 1973 the air force was established with Swedish help in the form of two Saab-MFI 15 two seat trainers. Saab also supplied two model 300 (269C) light helicopters for additional training with Ghanaian help, plus another was acquired as a presidential transport but was replaced in 1976 by a MBB Bo 105. In 1978 both the helicopters and light trainers were sold and the air arm disappeared; the Bo 105 was transferred to the civil register in 1985. In 1984 two Aérospatiale SA 355F Ecureuil 2 helicopters entered service with the ministry of defence. Five mercenary operated Mil Mi-24V and two Mil Mi-8 helicopters entered service from 1995.

The Republic of Sierra Leone Air Force was merged with the other services to form the RSL Armed Forces from 2002. Sierra Leone has a very small air component with a limited offensive capability. The status of its equipment is unknown, but the aircraft are not operable.

Current inventory

References

Further reading

Twenty-third Report of the SRSG on UNAMSIL, and Crisis Group Africa Report No. 87, 8 DEcember 2004.
Peter Albrecht and Paul Jackson, Security System Transformation in Sierra Leone, 1997–2007, Global Facilitation Network for Security Sector Reform, accessible at GFN-SSR Publications Archives 
T S Cox, Civil-Military Relations in Sierra Leone, Harvard University Press, London, 1976
Mimmi Soderberg Kovacs, Bringing the Good, the Bad and the Ugly into the Peace Fold: The Republic of Sierra Leone Armed Forces after the Lomé Peace Agreement, Department of Peace and Conflict Research, Uppsala University, paper prepared for presentation at the SGIR 7th Pan-European International Relations Conference in Stockholm, Sweden, 9–11 September 2010
Alex Neads, 'Improvise, adapt and fail to overcome? Capacity building, culture and exogenous change in Sierra Leone,' Journal of Strategic Studies, Volume 42, Issue 3–4, 2019.
Andrew Stewart, 'An Enduring Commitment: The British Military's Role in Sierra Leone,' Defence Studies (Journal of the Joint Services Command and Staff College), Volume 8, No. 3, September 2008
E D A Turay & A Abraham, The Sierra Leone Army: A Century of History, Macmillan Publishers, London & Basingstoke, 1978, accessible via the School of Oriental and African Studies, London
Sierra Leone Expenditure Review  (now dead link)

 
1961 establishments in Sierra Leone